Algology may refer to:

Algology (medicine), the study of pain
Phycology, also known as algology, the study of algae
Marine botany, also known as phycology and/or algology, the study of algae